Thurston High School may refer to:

 Lee M. Thurston High School, Redford, Michigan
 North Thurston High School, Lacey, Washington
 Thurston High School, Springfield, Oregon